The 1985 Dartmouth Big Green football team was an American football team that represented Dartmouth College during the 1985 NCAA Division I-AA football season. Dartmouth finished sixth in the Ivy League.

In their eighth season under head coach Joe Yukica, the Big Green compiled a 2–7–1 record and were outscored 199 to 144. Robert Brown and Leonard Fontes were the team captains.

The Big Green's 2–4–1 conference record placed sixth in the Ivy League standings. Dartmouth was outscored 105 to 95 by Ivy opponents.

Dartmouth played its home games at Memorial Field on the college campus in Hanover, New Hampshire.

Schedule

References

Dartmouth
Dartmouth Big Green football seasons
Dartmouth Big Green football